The British Rail Class 45 or Sulzer Type 4 are diesel locomotives built by British Railways' Derby and Crewe Works between 1960 and 1962. Along with the similar Class 44 and 46 locomotives, they became known as Peaks.

History

The Class 45s became the main traction on the Midland Main Line from 1962, and their introduction allowed considerable acceleration of the previous steam-powered service. The Class 45s remained the main source of power on the Midland Main Line up to 1982, when they were relegated to secondary services following introduction of HSTs on the route. From 1986 Class 45s virtually disappeared from the line. From the early 1980s until their withdrawal c.1988, the class were regular performers on the North Trans-Pennine line working services from Liverpool Lime Street to York, Scarborough or Newcastle via Manchester Victoria, Huddersfield and Leeds. These trains were usually formed of early Mark 2 carriages, of up to seven in a typical train.

Naming 

26 Class 45s were officially named by BR after various British Army regiments and the Royal Marines.  Additionally, several were unofficially named.

Engine
The unit was turbocharged and intercooled and gave  at 750 rpm. The engine was of the double bank type with two parallel banks of 6 cylinders, geared together to a single output shaft. Six-cylinder versions of the engine were fitted in the Class 25 locos (amongst others) and eight-cylinder versions in Class 33s. Class 45s were the updated versions of the Class 44 locomotives, the latter having a  non-intercooled version of the same engine; i.e. the 12LDA28A. The later Class 47 had a modified version of the same engine, a 12LDA28C.

Train heating
When initially put into service, the locomotives were fitted with multi-unit working and steam-heating boilers for passenger service. In the early 1970s, fifty were fitted with electric train supply in place of their steam-heating boilers and assigned to work services on the Midland Main Line from London St Pancras to Nottingham, Derby and Sheffield. These locomotives were renumbered as Class 45/1.

Auxiliary machines
The Class 45 is unusual in having a 220 volt electrical system for driving auxiliary machines and battery charging. Most British Railways diesels of the same era had 110 volt auxiliaries.

Accidents and incidents
 On 26 August 1976 locomotive No; 45 149 while hauling coal derailed near Winchcombe due to 'unusual' activity on the line.
 On 16 January 1982, locomotive No. 45 074 was hauling a freight train that was derailed at Chinley, Derbyshire.

 On 4 December 1984, locomotive No. 45 147 was badly damaged in the Eccles rail crash, and subsequently moved to Patricroft where it was cut-up in March 1985.
 On 9 March 1986, locomotive No. 45 014 The Cheshire Regiment was one of two light engines that were hit head-on by a passenger train at Chinley due to a signalman's error. One person was killed. Lack of training and a power cut were contributory factors. The locomotive was consequently withdrawn from service and scrapped.
 On 24 April 1988, locomotive No. 45 041 split a set of points and was derailed at Edale, Derbyshire.

Withdrawal
The great majority of Class 45s were withdrawn between 1981 and 1988 after class 43 HSTs were introduced to their routes, and the last was withdrawn from service by 1989.

Fleet details

Preservation

Eleven locomotives survive in preservation with examples from both batches. The majority of the preserved engines were built at Crewe Works but two of the preserved engines including the spares donor engine were built at Derby Works. A summary of these follows (more details in the table above):
 45041 – In operational condition at the Nene Valley Railway
 45060 – Undergoing engine overhaul at Barrow Hill Roundhouse
 45105 – Undergoing restoration at Barrow Hill Roundhouse
 45108 – In operational condition on loan at the East Lancashire Railway
 45112 – Stored at Nemesis Rail, Burton upon Trent
 45118 – Under overhaul at Barrow Hill Roundhouse
 45125 – In operational condition at the Great Central Railway
 45132 – Under overhaul at the Epping Ongar Railway
 45133 – Under overhaul at the Midland Railway – Butterley
 45135 – Under heavy repair at the East Lancashire Railway
 45149 – In operational condition at the Gloucestershire Warwickshire Railway

A twelfth example, 45015, was also sold into preservation, but not restored. Withdrawn in March 1986 with a seized traction motor, for which repair was not authorised, 45015 was heavily cannibalised for spares to keep other Class 45s working. It remained at Toton, its home shed, until at least 1999. The locomotive was moved to Shackerstone, on the Battlefield Line Railway, in 2002, still with the intention of restoration to mainline standard, despite requiring a replacement engine to be found. In 2010 the host railway gave notice to the locomotive's owner that the still-unrestored 45015 needed to move to a new site. Having failed to find a buyer, 45015 is in the process of being scrapped.

Model railways
Mainline Railways introduced OO gauge Class 45s in 1983; D100 Sherwood Forester in BR green and 45048 The Royal Marines in BR blue.

References

Further reading

External links

 Photos of Class 45s in action from 1970s to withdrawal and in preservation
 www.45133.co.uk

45
1Co-Co1 locomotives
Railway locomotives introduced in 1960
Standard gauge locomotives of Great Britain
Diesel-electric locomotives of Great Britain